Sheki can refer to:
 Shiki District (disambiguation), multiple places
 Sheki, Azerbaijan, a city 
 Shaki District or Şeki (Azerbaijani: Şəki rayonu) is a rayon of Azerbaijan whose capital is Sheki.
 Shaki Khanate
 Sheki, Ethiopia, a town in the Oromia Region of Ethiopia

See also
 Seki (disambiguation)